Santichaiprakarn Park is a small urban park of about 8 rai (round about 3 acres) in Bangkok located on the ending phase of Phra Athit Road, Chana Songkram Subdistrict, Phra Nakhon District east bank of Chao Phraya River at mouth of Khlong Bang Lamphu (Bang Lamphu Canal) in the area of Bang Lamphu. Opposite to Rama VIII Park in Thonburi side.

The park was built on the 72nd anniversary of King Bhumibol Adulyadej (Rama IX) on December 5, 1999. The king gave its name, meaningful "Signs of the Victory of Peace". Subsequently, the government granted Bangkok Metropolitan Administration (BMA) to act on February 21, 2000.  

The park houses the Santichaiprakarn Throne Hall and Phra Sumen Fort, built during the reign of King Phutthayotfa Chulalok (Rama I) since early Rattanakosin era, and the district's last mangrove apples, after which the area Bang Lamphu is named (mangrove apple called in Thai lamphu).

It is often used as a venue for watching Royal Barge Procession each time.

Transportation
BMTA bus: route  3, 6, 9, 30, 32, 33, 53, 64
Chao Phraya Express Boat: Phra Arthit Pier (N13)

References

External links

Official Thai Website
Phra Nakhon district
Parks in Bangkok
1999 establishments in Thailand
Buildings and structures on the Chao Phraya River